Loti may refer to:

Loti, Pakistan, a town and union council 
Pierre Loti, the pseudonym of Louis Marie Julien Viaud, a French writer
Lesotho loti, the currency of Lesotho
LOTI, Internet slang for "laughing on the inside"
Levels of Technology Integration - The LoTI model for assessing technology integration in schools
Loti, song by Albanian singer and songwriter Elvana Gjata

See also

Lotti (given name)